Yammie Lam Kit-ying (27 April 1963 – 31 October 2018), also known as Yammie Nam, was a Hong Kong actress and most notable for her performances in TVB drama series The Greed of Man and Looking Back In Anger, as well as in the film series A Chinese Odyssey. Lam was found dead in her apartment at Leung Ma House (Ma Hang Estate) in Stanley, Hong Kong, on 31 October 2018.

Career
Lam first joined TVB in 1983, graduating from the TVB actor training class a year later along with fellow actress Margie Tsang. She was cast in a number of movies as well as TVB serials, soon becoming well known as one of the TVB's Five Beauties. She was called "the most beautiful on the five-station hill" (靚絕五台山).

In 1991, Lam played the leading female role in a Taiwanese TV series. Taiwanese actress Di Ying, who was also a member of the same series, disliked Lam. Once, Di waited for Lam in a hotel lobby. and kicked her in the stomach so hard that Lam stumbled far away backwards on the floor. Lam never worked with Taiwanese companies again. Di later vividly described her assault on Lam on a Taiwanese variety show with no regret, calling her "Lam the big shot", long after Lam's retirement.

In 1993, Yammie Lam won Top 10 TV Actors/Actresses at the Next TV Awards for her performance in a 1992 TV series The Greed of Man.

Personal life
She was in a relationship with a Hong Kong indigenous villager Johnny Tang (鄧啟揚), but Tang committed suicide on May 25, 1986, which greatly shocked her. From November 1986 to 1987, she had a relationship with  郑家成, a son of Hong Kong billionaire Cheng Yu-tung, but they eventually broke up.

In 1995 and 1997, Lam's parents died in succession. She broke up with her boyfriend afterwards. In September 1998, she got into a car accident. In December 1998, it was suspected that she was raped by Eric Tsang during Tsang's film production in Singapore. She had suffered from depression from April 1999 till her death. Her stage career was completely shattered by then despite her showing up in a few TV serials or movies afterwards.

Declared bankrupt in 2006, Lam subsequently lived on government welfare of HK$3,700 per month.

In March 2013, Lam was baptised as a Catholic at St. Anne's Church in Stanley and was given the Christian name Maria.

Rape allegations
In December 2013, Next Magazine obtained the video of an interview with Lam, in which she said that she had been raped by two Hong Kong entertainment industry "big brothers" more than two decades earlier. Lam stated that the first man, who had raped her after consuming alcohol, had died recently. Lam alleged that another man raped her during a film production in Singapore by obtaining a key to her room, entering her room at night and rape her. She said that fears about his influence in the film industry dissuaded her from reporting the incident to the police. During the interview, the interviewer mentioned the names of the two accused rapists which was not heard but Lam acknowledged to be correct. It was noticed that portions which the interviewer mentioned the names were censored out of Next Magazine published video; it is unknown if the edits were made by the magazine or by the interviewer. Subsequently, an anonymous source cited on Sina News corroborated the alleged rape in Singapore and claimed that the important man had announced, to the film crew, his intention of "having fun" with Lam before he allegedly broke into her room. 

In January 2018, Chinese journalist  uploaded what appeared to be the uncensored video of Lam's interview, which revealed the alleged rapists to be Eric Tsang and Alan Tang (deceased in 2011). A day later, the rape accusation against Eric Tsang was corroborated by Grace Han, a prominent talent agent who formerly headed the Ford Models agency in Asia. Han further alleged that Eric Tsang was a serial sexual predator, and claimed to know of a specific incident where a group of showbiz men led by Tsang drugged seven female models in a Hong Kong karaoke bar and raped six of them, while one model escaped. Tsang denied both the authenticity of the video and Grace Han's claims, and a week later, filed a defamation law suit at the Hong Kong High Court against Han.

Several media outlets raised concerns that the audio portion of the 2018 video could have been edited, noting that the interviewer's voice increased in pitch from a male-sounding individual in the 2013 video to a female-sounding individual in the 2018 video. However, experts suggested that the most likely explanation was that the published 2013 video was digitally altered to disguise the identity of the interviewer, and that the interviewer was in fact female. They also point out that the 2018 video contained unremoved background noises, indicating that it was either the original video or in an earlier state of edit compared to the 2013 video, which had noise cancellation. This implies that the person who leaked the video had access to the original unedited video and is most likely the interviewer herself.

Death
On 3 November 2018, Lam was found dead in her apartment at Leung Ma House (Ma Hang Estate) in Stanley, Hong Kong. Police noted that she was found in a decomposing state, and she was last seen alive on 31 October.

In the evening of 9 November, a requiem mass was held for Lam at St. Anne's Church celebrated by Dominic Chan Chi-ming, the vicar general of the Catholic Diocese of Hong Kong. Hundreds of fans came to pay tribute to Lam. Some actors and actresses who played in The Greed of Man attended the mass. Dicky Cheung read the Scripture and Maggie Chen gave a speech. Father Chan said that he had met Lam five years earlier, and that Lam had suffered a lot.

Lam was cremated on 15 November 2018, and her ashes were interred at the St. Raphael Catholic Cemetery in Cheung Sha Wan.

Filmography

Film

Television

References

External links
JayneStars - English translated news about Yammie Lam

Converts to Roman Catholicism
20th-century Hong Kong actresses
1963 births
2018 deaths
TVB actors
21st-century Hong Kong actresses
Hong Kong film actresses
Hong Kong television actresses
Hong Kong Roman Catholics